Ceromacra is a genus of moths of the family Erebidae. The genus was erected by Achille Guenée in 1852.

Species
Ceromacra cocala Stoll, 1780
Ceromacra cebrensis Schaus, 1914
Ceromacra erebusalis Walker, 1858
Ceromacra putida Dognin, 1912
Ceromacra tymber Cramer, 1777

References

Calpinae